Rhapsodie espagnole may refer to:

 Rapsodie espagnole, an orchestral rhapsody by Maurice Ravel
 Rhapsodie espagnole (Liszt), a composition for solo piano by Franz Liszt
 Rapsodia española, a musical composition by Isaac Albéniz
 España  (Chabrier), a rhapsody for orchestra by Emmanuel Chabrier

See also
 Spanish Rhapsody, a 1991 album by Kenny Wheeler